Qasīdat al-Hamziyya, or al-Hamziyya for short, is a thirteenth-century ode of praise for the Islamic prophet Muhammad composed by the eminent Sufi mystic Imam al-Busiri of Egypt.

See also
Al-Busiri
Al-Burda
Madeeh
Durood
Islamic poetry

References

External links

Works by Al-Busiri
Islamic poetry
Sufi literature
Panegyrics
Medieval Arabic poems
Sunni literature
Muhammad
13th-century Arabic books
Arabic poems